Loch Bruicheach is a remote mountain loch, situated on the edge of Boblainy Forest in the Highland council area of Scotland. The nearest settlement to it is Eskadale, a small hamlet 1.74 miles (2.8 km) to the north, across a wide stretch of moorland.

The name may derive from an Old Gaelic word meaning "boiling" or "raging", and is shared with the loch's primary outflow, the Bruiach Burn.

Archaeological evidence has shown the loch to have once contained a crannog on its north shore.

In the past, Loch Bruicheach has been a great fishing ground for the common greenshank, a rare bird in the area.

References 

Lochs of Highland (council area)